Mohamed Abdulla Abdelaslam (born 1954) is a retired Libyan long jumper.

He finished fourth at the 1983 Mediterranean Games and competed at the 1983 World Championships without reaching the final.

References 

1954 births
Living people
Libyan long jumpers
World Athletics Championships athletes for Libya
Athletes (track and field) at the 1983 Mediterranean Games
Mediterranean Games competitors for Libya